Grafton Post Office may refer to:

Grafton Post Office (Grafton, North Dakota), listed on the National Register of Historic Places
Grafton Post Office (Grafton, Vermont), listed on the National Register of Historic Places